G6, G.VI, G.6 or G-6 may refer to:

International politics 
 G6 (EU), the six largest European Union members
 Group of Six, a 1975 international summit which led to the G7 and G8
 44th G7 summit, referred to as the "G6+1" or just "G6" due to a significant internal conflict with the United States

Transportation 
 G6 Beijing–Lhasa Expressway, a highway in China

Land
 G6 howitzer, a South African self-propelled howitzer
 Ford G6, an automobile manufactured by the Ford Motor Company of Australia
 Mazda G6 engine, a piston engine made by Mazda
 Pontiac G6, a mid-size car that was produced under the Pontiac brand of American automaker General Motors
 Vossloh G6, shunting locomotive
 LNER Class G6, a class of British steam locomotives

Air

 Caudron G.6, a 1916 French reconnaissance aircraft

 Bf 109 G-6, Variant of a World War 2 German fighter aircraft
 Gulfstream G650, a business jet aircraft

Other 
 G6, the third note in the whistle register
 G6 star, a subclass of G-class stars
 Group 6 element of the periodic table

 G6, a square on a chessboard or a move of a pawn to that square in algebraic chess notation
 LG G6, a smartphone manufactured by LG
 Moto G6, a smartphone by Motorola Mobility
 Samsung Galaxy S6, a smartphone by Samsung Mobile
 Like a G6, a song by Far East Movement